Towson Square, originally known as Towson Circle III while in planning, is an outdoor mall constructed between 2013 and 2014 in Towson, Maryland. The outdoor mall is estimated to cost have $85 million  to be built by its developers, Cordish Company and Heritage Properties, Inc.. It was to be anchored by a 16-screen movie theater operated by Cinemark. The Cinemark theater somewhere between its initial announcement and its construction was reduced by 1 screen and officially opened on Thursday, July 10, 2014, as a 15-screen theater.

The development now occupies an area that was primarily parking lots located between East Joppa Road, Delaware, Virginia, and East Pennsylvania avenues. The developer intended to incorporate into a planned park an existing, an historic cemetery that borders on Shealy Avenue. Shealy Avenue crosses roughly through the center of the development's property.

On Thursday, July 10, 2014, Cinemark officially opened its 15 screen movie theater at Towson Square as part of its 30-year anniversary celebrations. The theater featured Cinemark's then newest concept, a reserve level where people could actually reserve specific luxury seats in a special area and have an expanded food selection and alcoholic beverages. It also features Cinemark's NextGen concept that has been described as offering "the latest technology and amenities under one roof." The Baltimore Sun reported that the Towson Cinemark theater is Cinemark's official international flagship movie theater, replacing its former international flagship location in Dallas, Texas.

In 2014 Towson Square was sold to Retail Properties of America Inc  for $40.5 million, thus allowing them to integrate the development adjacent into one entity called Circle East.

Current tenants include Bonefish Grill, BJ's Restaurant, Cinemark, Ethan Allen, Nando's, On the Border Mexican Grill & Cantina, Shake Shack, and Urban Outfitters.

References

2013 establishments in Maryland
Buildings and structures in Baltimore County, Maryland
Shopping malls established in 2013
Shopping malls in Maryland
The Cordish Companies
Towson, Maryland